West Washington Historic District is a national historic district located at South Bend, St. Joseph County, Indiana.  It encompasses 330 contributing buildings in an upper class residential section of South Bend. It developed between about 1854 and 1910, and includes notable examples of Italianate, Greek Revival, and Romanesque Revival style architecture. Located in the district are the separately listed Morey-Lampert House, Oliver Mansion (Copshaholm, 1896) designed by Lamb and Rich, Second St. Joseph County Courthouse, South Bend Remedy Company Building, and Tippecanoe Place. Other notable buildings include the Bartlett House (1850), Birdsell House (1897), DeRhodes House (Avalon Grotto, 1906) designed by Frank Lloyd Wright, Holley House (c. 1860), Kaiser-Schmidt House (c. 1890), Listenberger-Nemeth House (c. 1870), Meahger-Daughterty House (1884), O'Brien House (c. 1920),  Oren House (c. 1875), The People's Church (1889), St. Hedwig's Church (c. 1895), St. Patrick's Church (1886), St. Paul's Memorial United Methodist Church (1901), West House (c. 1850), and a row of worker's houses (c. 1865–1900).

It was listed on the National Register of Historic Places in 1975.

References

Historic districts on the National Register of Historic Places in Indiana
Italianate architecture in Indiana
Greek Revival architecture in Indiana
Romanesque Revival architecture in Indiana
Historic districts in South Bend, Indiana
National Register of Historic Places in St. Joseph County, Indiana